Hess is an unincorporated community in southeast Jackson County, in the U.S. state of Oklahoma. The community is approximately 4.5 miles east-southeast of Elmer and 14 miles west-northwest of Frederick in adjacent Tillman County. The Red River and the Texas border are four miles to the south.

History
A post office called Hess was established in 1889, and remained in operation until 1920. Elvira P Hess, an early postmaster, gave the community her family name.

Notable people
 Earlene Risinger, a pitcher in the All-American Girls Professional Baseball League, was born in Hess in 1927.
 Hobart Brown, American sculptor and founder of Kinetic Sculpture Racing, was born in Hess in 1934.

References

Unincorporated communities in Jackson County, Oklahoma
Unincorporated communities in Oklahoma